Brian McGurk (Maguirc) was a Catholic Dean of Armagh during the Penal Times in Ireland, and was Vicar-General to St Oliver Plunkett.

Background
He was imprisoned in Armagh under penal laws in 1712 while in his late eighties. He died in Gaol aged 91 years

Brian McGurk was Dean of Armagh for forty years and parish priest of Termonmagurk 1660-1672, arrested five times under the penal law statute, but who out-witted the courts with his knowledge of canon and civil laws yet dying at ninety-one in Armagh gaol. He is still revered as a 'white martyr' in Termonmagurk where both churches, Catholic and Protestant are under the patronage of St. Columcille, the McGurks being the saint's coarbs and erenaghs in that parish.

Brian was born and raised in the townland of Aughnagreggan, near Carrickmore, County Tyrone. In 2013 a small monument was erected on the site of his home to commemorate the 300th anniversary of his death. A secondary school in the village is named after him. A Celtic cross stands in the grounds of the Roman Catholic Church dedicated to his memory.

References
T. MacDonald (1948), Dean Bryan McGurk, a hero of the penal days; with historical notes on his times and his native parish, Termonmagurk, Co. Tyrone

Notes

Roman Catholic deans
17th-century Irish Roman Catholic priests
Irish people who died in prison custody
Prisoners who died in British detention
Year of death unknown
Year of birth unknown
18th-century Irish Roman Catholic priests